The statue of Sir Thomas Jackson, 1st Baronet is a bronze sculpture by Mario Raggi, installed in Statue Square, a public pedestrian square in Central, Hong Kong. It was unveiled on 24 February 1906 by the 
Governor of Hong Kong, Sir Matthew Nathan. At that time, the statue was facing the HSBC building.

References

External links

 

1906 establishments in Hong Kong
1906 sculptures
Bronze sculptures in Hong Kong
Central, Hong Kong
Monuments and memorials in Hong Kong
Outdoor sculptures in Hong Kong
Sculptures of men in Hong Kong
Statues in Hong Kong